Turkish Canadians (literally "Turkish-originating Canadians"), also called Canadian Turks, are Canadian citizens of Turkish descent. The majority of Canadian Turks descend from the Republic of Turkey; however, there has also been significant Turkish migration from other post-Ottoman modern nation-states including ethnic Turkish communities which have come to Canada from the Balkans (especially from Bulgaria, Greece, Kosovo, North Macedonia and Romania), the island of Cyprus, as well as other parts of the Levant (Iraq, Lebanon and Syria), and North Africa (especially from Egypt).

History 
Turks first began to immigrate to Canada in small numbers from the Ottoman Empire. However, significant migration initially began in the late 1950s and early 1960s when the Turkish government encouraged student education abroad. There have also been Turks fleeing from unrest and oppression in Bulgaria and Cyprus who arrived in Canada as both political and economic refugees.

Turkish migration from the Ottoman Empire
In 1901, Canada had between 300–400 Muslim residents, equally divided between Turks and Syrian Arabs. By 1911, the size of the Muslim community had increased to about 1,500, of whom 1,000 were of Turkish origin and the remainder were Arabs. During the pre-World War I period, Turks were to be found in mining and logging camps across Canada. However, due to bad relations between the Ottoman Empire and Allied Powers of WWI, further migration was made difficult for the Turks and the Canadian government discouraged "Asian" immigration. Thus, by the onset of World War I, Canada witnessed the return of many Turkish immigrants who were then classified as "enemy aliens". Another reason for the return-migration of Ottoman Turks was because for the majority of Turks, the founding of the new republic of Turkey in 1923 was a greater incentive to stay at home.

With the Canadian Immigration Act of 1910, immigrating to the country was banned. This policy wasn't changed until 1978. The reason behind this xenophobic act was the government’s claim that immigrants were hard to assimilate. The 1919, 14 March Act banned people of German, Hungarian, Bulgarian, Austrian and Turkish backgrounds from immigrating to Canada, except if the Minister of Immigration didn't give special permission. This prohibition was strictly racial and wasn’t related to Enemy Alien prohibition. However this nativism didn't last so long: after four years, this ban was lifted because the Canadian economy needed cheap labor.

Internment of Turks in Canada, 1914 
The Ottoman Empire declared war on Britain in November 5, 1914. Only five days later, on November 10, 1914, 98 Turks were deported and settled in Kingston and then in Kapuskasing. Their number increased over time. They weren’t the only “enemy aliens” subjected to internment. More than 8,500 people were placed in 24 camps during the war. Of them 205 were Turks. Majority of them were from Eastern Anatolia, Harput. Many foreigners have been interned for wanting to leave Canada, which in the eyes of the government posed a threat. Others were sent to the camps because they had suspicious activities. The number of these foreigners was not small at all - they numbered 393,320. 3,880 of them were from the Ottoman Empire.

According to the newspapers, the reason for the detention of the Turks was the government's desire to protect 400 Armenians living in Brantford, where the majority of the Turkish population was concentrated. The Armenians were worried that the Turks would attack them.  It is possible that the letter of the Armenian missionary of Brantford, Armen Amirkhanian influenced the city council. He spoke to Brantford City Council that Armenians were loyal to Britain and that they were not ethnic Turks. Armen also had mentioned the massacres that took place and that the Armenians suffered a lot because of the Turks. His letter had showed results and news of Armenians loyal to Britain appearеd in the newspapers. According to other newspapers, Turks in the city have tried to bomb a newly created post office. The truth of this statement is debatable, as many Turks in Canada couldn't even read or write. Apart from ethnic Armenians, other Ottoman citizens, such as the Orthodox Macedonians and Greeks were also not deported. Also, many of these Turks left Eastern Anatolia to earn enough money to buy land in their homeland and live in their native places. Despite these misunderstandings, the Armenian community, also from Harput, tried to help these Turks. Even the Turks in America, Massachusetts, hired two lawyers to bring the Canadian Turks to America, but their attempts were unsuccessful. Although Turkey, as soon as it learned of what was happening, tried to help its compatriots, its attempts were unsuccessful, especially after the Turks were banned from sending letters to the Ottoman Empire, even to their families, on November 25.

At least three of those detained died, two went insane, six returned to Turkey and 43 remained in Canada. Another part immigrated to America, Michigan, where they worked in the Ford factory. The name of one of the dead is Alex Hassan, whose real name is most likely Ali Hassan, but the Canadians changed his name for easier pronunciation. They served in the construction of the camp in which they remained. But some of them were later released, with the obligation to work, as during the war, the economy of factories increased and the government needed manpower. The names of some of 16 Muslims in Mount Hope Cemetery are believed to belong to them. Five of them died in 1916 and 1918. In 2014, the Turkish consul of Canada visited the cemetery. Some people, especially the Canadian-Armenian community had claimed that it is a political act and created online petition to “stop the fake monument.”

The Muslim plot of the Mount Hope cemetery exists since 1912 and seven names belong to men that died before the 1914 events. Many added that before a century, everyone in the Ottoman empire was known as “Turk”. Seven of the graves belonged to men that died before the 1914 events. These actions tried to prevent a memorial plaque describing the events of 1914 from being erected on the site. According to an Armenian, “identifying (those buried in the plot) with Turkey and the Turkish government would be an injustice.” He also claimed that the buried people are actually Alevi Muslims, “the idea of having a monument endorsed by the Turkish government that incorrectly labels Alevi as though they were Turks is a “real injustice”, For many this was a Turcophobic act. There were claims that this was similar to the Armenian genocide denial. Barçın Yinanç wrote "it would have been much wiser to come and attend the ceremony and perhaps give messages or letters to the Turkish ambassador, asking the Turkish state to show the same sensitivity to the thousands of dead Armenians".

Turkish migration from the Republic of Turkey
In the late 1950s and early 1960s, the government of Turkey encouraged and financially supported Turkish students to study in Canada. Thus, the early 1960s consisted primarily of students and professionals, especially doctors and engineers. Significant Turkish immigration began during the 1960s and 1970s; most Turks went to Canada for educational and economic opportunities. According to the 1972 Canada census there were 9,342 Turkish-born persons living in Canada.

Turkish migration from the Balkans

Bulgaria

In the 1980s Turkish Bulgarians were fleeing from the Bulgarisation policies, known as the so-called "Revival Process", which targeted the Turkish minority group; consequently, many arrived in Canada as refugees. In addition, Turkish Bulgarian refugees who had originally settled in Sweden and then returned to Bulgaria in the 1990s were forced to flee again and sought life in Western countries such as Canada, England, the United States, Turkey and Germany.

Greece

There have been several waves of migration from the Turkish minority of Western Thrace to Canada. The first wave of Turkish Western Thracian migration started in the 1960s and intensified between 1970-2010 due to political and economic reasons; this was followed by a significantly larger wave in 2010-18 due to the Greek government-debt crisis.

Romania

According to Dr Eleanor Bujea, the early history of Turkish Romanians in Canada (which began in the 1910s) is similar to that of Jewish Romanians. Many initially homesteaded and raised their families on farms whilst some went into the grocery businesses or opened street carts. However, after the First World War, many of these people moved to large cities where some intermarried and assimilated.

Turkish migration from the Levant

Cyprus

During the 1950s, Turkish Cypriots started to leave Cyprus for political reasons when the Greek Cypriots held a referendum in which 95.7% of Greek Cypriots supported enosis, the union of Cyprus with Greece. By 1963, inter-ethnic fighting broke out in Cyprus, with Turkish Cypriots bearing the heavier cost in terms of casualties and some 25,000 Turkish Cypriots became internally displaced accounting to about a fifth of their population. Tension continued to grow by the late 1960s and approximately 60,000 Turkish Cypriots left their homes and moved into enclaves. This resulted in an exodus of more Turkish Cypriots from the island, many migrating to Canada. In 1983, Turkish Cypriots unilaterally proclaimed the establishment of their own state, the Turkish Republic of Northern Cyprus (TRNC), which has since remained internationally unrecognized except by Turkey. Since the division of the island, the Turkish Cypriot economy has remained stagnant and undeveloped because of the economic embargoes which have been imposed on the north.

Iraq

In 2010 there was approximately 1,000 Iraqi Turks living in Canada.

Syria

Since Justin Trudeau was elected as Prime Minister of Canada in 2015, over 25,000 Syrian refugees have settled in Canada; these have included Arabs, Syrian Kurds and Syrian Turks as well as other minority groups.

Demographics

Official data
The following is the number of people who have voluntarily declared their ethnicity as "Turkish" in official censuses. The actual number of Turkish Canadians is believed to be considerably higher.

Estimated population
In 2018 the Canadian Ambassador, Chris Cooter, said that there was approximately 100,000 Turkish Canadians living in the country, as well as several thousand Turkish students:

In 2019 the "Federation of Chinese Canadians in Markham" also reported that there was over 100,000 Turkish Canadians in the country.

Culture

Religion
The majority of Turkish Canadians are Sunnis with minorities being Alevis and people generally do not have any religious affiliation. Prior to 1980, Turkish Canadian immigrants were from both urban and secular backgrounds. Religion remained an affair of the private conscience. In May 1983, the Canadian Turkish Islamic Heritage Association (Kanada Türk İslam Kültür Derneği) was established, followed by the Canadian Turkish Islamic Trust (Kanada Türk İslam Vakfı) in April 1987.

Festivals

The Toronto Turkish Festival
The Calgary Turkish Festival
The Edmonton Turkish Festival
The Ottawa Turkish Festival

Language 
Turkish Canadians are generally fluent in Turkish, but may speak an Anglicized dialect, slang, or version, informally called "Türkilizce". This unofficial, informal dialect is common among younger Canadian Turks, and is characterized by the addition of English loanwords to otherwise completely Turkish conversations (for example, the Turkish translation of "to schedule" would be "tarih belirlemek", but a Türkilizce speaker would say "schedule etmek").

Media

Social media 
 Turkish Association of Canada
 Anatolian Heritage Foundation
  Intercultural Dialogue Institute
 Toronto Bilgi

Turkish newspapers 
 Canadaturk
 Referans
 Idinews
 Bizim Anadolu
 Canatolian

Turkish Television Channels 
 Turkuaz TV

Turkish Radio Channels 
 Radio Perfect

Sports 
 Atak Sports - Zafer Biryol Soccer Academy

Education 
Since 2005, Nile Academy, a private, secular school run by Turkish administration linked to a nonprofit organization called Canadian Turkish Friendship Community, has grown exponentially over the years. Within eleven years, they managed to open their 3rd school within Ontario. They have also opened a dormitory located near Jane Street and Eglinton Avenue West, Toronto. Throughout the years, Nile Academy has competed in Turkish Language Olympiads and many wrestling tournaments in Ontario.

In the mid 2010s, Nile Academy closed its main dormitory, and merged its three campuses into a single one, located in the Humber Summit neighbourhood of Toronto.

Nile Academy is also linked with the Islamic cleric, author, and scholar, Fethullah Gülen as well as the Gülen Movement. They have had many notable alumni since they opened in 2005.

Associations
Since the 1960s, many community organizations have appeared representing various groups of Turkish immigrants. The various associations across Canada are currently represented by the "Federation of Canadian Turkish Associations", an umbrella organization founded in the mid-1980s. The federation serves as a referral and communications centre for news of Turkey, local events, business and governmental inquiries, and intergroup relations.  More recently, a similar Turkish Cypriot umbrella group, the "Federation of Turkish Cypriot Associations of Canada", was established; the "Canadian Association for Solidarity of Turks from Bulgaria" also forms part of the federation.

The Federation of Canadian Turkish Associations is an umbrella organization representing 17 member associations from Victoria to Quebec, which include approximately 50,000 Canadians of Turkish origin. The federation was established in 1985 and is a non-profit organization with no political affiliations. It supports and encourages activities that deal with important cultural, economic, educational, historical, social and religious issues that relate to the Turkish community in Canada.

 Anatolian Heritage Federation 
 Ankara Library
 Association of Balkan Canadians
 Association of Canadian Turkish Cypriots 
 Canadian Alevi Culture Centre
 Canadian Association for Solidarity of Turks from Bulgaria 
 Canadian Iraqi Turkmen Culture Association of London
 Canadian Turkish Cultural Association of Hamilton
 Canadian Turkish Film Society
 Canadian Turkish Islamic Heritage Association INC.
 Council of Turkish Canadians
 The Federation of Canadian Turkish Associations
 Intercultural Dialogue Institute
 K-W Turkish cultural association
 Turkish Association of Canada (TAC)
 The Turkish Canadian Association of London
 Turkish Canadian Cultural Association
 Turkish Canadian Cultural Association of Calgary
 Turkish Canadian Society
 Turkish Canadian Society of Edmonton
 Turkish Canadian Society of Vancouver
 The Turkish Community Heritage Centre of Canada
 Turkish Federation Community Foundation
 Turkish Culture and Folklore Society
 The Turkish Quebec Cultural and Friendship Association
 Turkish Society of Canada
 Turkish Society of Nova Scotia
 The United Canadian Muslim Association
 United Canadian Turkish Cultural Association

Notable people

See also 

Canada–Turkey relations
Canadians in Turkey
Embassy of Turkey in Ottawa
Middle Eastern Canadians
West Asian Canadians
Turkish diaspora
British Turks 
Turkish Americans
Turkish Australians
Turkish New Zealanders

References

Bibliography 

 .
 .
.
 
 
.
 
.

External links 
 Turkish Schools in Canada Nile Academy
 Turkish Schools in Canada Nebula Academy
 Anatolian Heritage Federation Anatolian Heritage Federation
 Anatolian Cultural Centre Anatolian Cultural Centres
 Dicle Islamic Society Dicle Islamic Society
 Turkish Canadian Chamber of Commerce TCCC
 Association of Balkan Canadians Association of Balkan Canadians
 The Federation of Canadian Turkish Associations
 Turkish Culture and Folklore Society
 ANKARA Library
 Turkish Federation Community Foundation
 Turkish Canadian Cultural Association of Calgary
 Turkish Society of Nova Scotia
 Turkish Canadian Society (Vancouver)
 The Turkish Quebec Cultural and Friendship Association
 Turkish Canadian Society of Edmonton
 CANADIAN TURKISH ISLAMIC HERITAGE ASSOCIATION INC.
 CANADIAN IRAQI TURKMEN CULTURE ASSOCIATION OF LONDON
 Turkish Canadian Cultural Association 
 Türk Kanada
 Canadian Turkish Business Council
 Turkish Society of Canada
 Canada Turk
 Turkish Board Game Seller
 Canatolian Turkish language business newspaper
 Toronto Information
 Turkuaz TV (Canadian Turkish Media Association)
 Radio Perfect
 Turk News
 Bizim Anadolu
 Perfect Gazete
 Kanada'da Bir Türk
 Turkish Canadian

Turkish Canadian
Canada

Asian Canadian
Ethnic groups in Canada
European Canadian
 
West Asian Canadians